Italian submarine Enrico Toti (S 506) was the first of a new class of Italian submarine (Toti-class), with the S 506 Enrico Toti being laid down in 1965, launched in 1967, decommissioned in 1992 and preserved as a museum ship in Museo della Scienza e della Tecnologia "Leonardo da Vinci", in Milan.  The ship, and class, are named after the Italian war hero Enrico Toti.

History

Toti was built by Fincantieri in Monfalcone, between 1965 and 1967, and given to the Italian Navy in 1968; Soon after that three more identical units were added to what is called the "classe Toti". 
They are small submarines (so small that they were called “pocket sized submarines”), employed from the late 1960s until the end of the 90s. They were conceived to work inside the Mediterranean sea and have never had to face real war situations. They had two main tasks: 
 patrol the Mediterranean sea with special attention to the Channel of Sicily during the Cold War; for this reason their main base was the Military Arsenal of Augusta (Syracuse);
 participate in NATO exercises with other submarines (US).

The Enrico Toti arrived at the Museo della Scienza e della Tecnologia "Leonardo da Vinci" in August 2005 with a trip in two steps:
 2001: From Augusta to the Cremona port, towed through the Adriatic sea and the Po (14 days)
 2005: From Cremona to Milan, on top of a specially built convoy, on a road trip lasting four nights.

As museum ship the Toti is unusual, because Milan has no direct access to the sea or a significant river. Moreover, the museum is in the inner part of the city. The transportation of the sub to the museum was made overnight in mid-August, to minimize inconvenience to the population.

Another Toti-class unit is on exhibition at the Arsenale in Venice, while the remaining two are still in Augusta and are scheduled for scrapping.

Recently, a stray female cat was found near the museum and personnel brought her in the Toti, where she lives and is called "the last captain of the Toti".

In 2016, the Italian telephonic company TIM filmed a TV spot with people dancing, including Santa Claus on a beach, some Star Wars First Order Stormtroopers, an astronaut with an Apollo/Skylab A7L spacesuit on the Moon and two sailors on the harbour mole-like entrance of the museum ship.

Technical data

 Length: 46 m
 Width: 4,75 m
 Speed: 9.5 knots in surface, 14 knots underwater
 Operational depth: 150 m 
 Test depth: 300m
 Displacement: 530 tons in surface, 590 tons underwater
 Engines: 1 electrical propeller engine (900 hp); two Fiat diesel engines (1040 hp) generating electrical power.
 Armament: 4 launcher tubes for 533-mm torpedoes; wire-guided electrical torpedoes with auto-guided warhead.

References

See also

Toti-class submarines
Ships built in Monfalcone
1967 ships
Submarines of Italy
Museo Nazionale Scienza e Tecnologia Leonardo da Vinci
Museum ships in Italy
Ships preserved in museums